The Nawarat-class corvette (also N-class corvette) is a class of corvettes which was operated by the Myanmar Navy. The lead ship of the class is UMS Nawarat (501) and it was commissioned in October 1960. The second ship, UMS Nagakyay (502) was commissioned in December 1961. Both of them are built at the Dawbon Government Shipyard, Yangon, with Yugoslavian assistance.

In spite of their size, both ships were used primarily for river patrols and rarely ventured out to sea. They were each armed with one ex-Army 25-pounder field gun and a Bofors 40 mm gun purchased from Sweden and two Oerlikon 20 mm cannons which were fitted on each side of the ship.

Ships of the class

References 

Ship classes built by Myanmar Navy
Corvettes of Myanmar